US Post Office-Johnson City is a historic post office building located at 307 Main Street in Johnson City in Broome County, New York.  It was designed and built in 1934 and is one of a number of post offices in New York State designed by the Office of the Supervising Architect of the Treasury Department, Louis A. Simon.  The interior features a mural by Frederic Charles Knight.

It was listed on the National Register of Historic Places in 1989.

References

Buildings and structures in Broome County, New York
Johnson City
National Register of Historic Places in Broome County, New York
Government buildings completed in 1934
Colonial Revival architecture in New York (state)
Treasury Relief Art Project
1934 establishments in New York (state)